

Events and publications
Publishers Star Publications, Toby Press, and Youthful make their debuts; conversely, Columbia Comics, Novelty Press, and Street & Smith Comics all fold.

Year overall

January
 January 22: Peyo's gag comic Poussy is first published in Le Soir.
 Captain America Comics (1941 series) #70 - Timely Comics
 Human Torch Comics (1940 series) #34 - Timely Comics
 Jughead #1 - Archie Comics

February
 Lana (1948 series) #4 - Timely Comics
Marvel Mystery Comics (1939 series) #90 - Timely Comics
 Sub-Mariner Comics (1941 series) #30 - Timely Comics
 Two-Gun Kid (1948 series) #6 - Timely Comics

March
 Captain America Comics (1941 series) #71 - Timely Comics
 Human Torch Comics (1940 series) #35 - Timely Comics - (The series will be cancelled for five years)
 Nipper, by Doug Wright, debuts in the March 12 issue of The Montreal Standard. The weekly comic strip would run until 1980 in magazines distributed across Canada.

April
 April 9: The final issue of the Italian Disney comics magazine Topolino is published. It becomes a digest instead.
 April 25: First publication of Wally Fawkes' (aka Trog) Flook in The Daily Mail.
 The final episode of the Belgian comic magazine Bimbo is published.
In Walt Disney’s comics and stories, Rival beachcombers, by Carl Barks; debut of Judge Owl.
 Captain America Comics (1941 series) #72 - Timely Comics
Lana (1948 series) #5 - Timely Comics
 Marvel Mystery Comics (1939 series) #91 - Timely Comics
 Sub-Mariner Comics (1941 series) #31 - Timely Comics
 Two-Gun Kid (1948 series) #7 - Timely Comics
Venus (1948 series) #4 - Timely Comics

May
 May 22: First publication of Warren Tufts' Casey Ruggles as a Sunday strip. It will become a daily strip on 19 September.
May 26, Mefisto la spia by Gian Luigi Bonelli and Aurelio Galleppini; Tex Willer meets his most famous antagonist, Steve Deckart, alias Mefisto. The villain, here, is again a simple illusionist and spy, without the supernatural powers that he will get later.
 The final issue of the Belgian comics magazine Wrill is published.

June
 Lana (1948 series) #6 - Timely Comics
Marvel Mystery Comics (1939 series) #92. The final issue under this title; with the next issue it changes title and format to Marvel Tales - Timely Comics
 Sub-Mariner Comics (1941 series) #32 - Timely Comics - (The series will be cancelled for five years)
 Two-Gun Kid (1948 series) #8 - Timely Comics
Venus (1948 series) #5 - Timely Comics
 Western Winners, with issue #5, takes over the numbering of All-Western Winners — Atlas Comics

July
 July 10: Jules Feiffer's gag comic Clifford, which appeared earlier this year during the spring in Will Eisner's one-shot Kewpies, is now moved to The Spirit comic book magazine as a back cover feature. It will run until 4 March 1951.
July 21: Montales el desperado by Gian Luigi Bonelli and Aurelio Gallepini; debut of the Mexican revolutionary Montales, a recurring character in the Tex Willer saga.
 Captain America Comics (1941 series) #73 - Timely Comics - (The series will be renamed to Captain America's Weird Tales)

August
 August 4: Halfway the prepublication of The Adventures of Tintin story Land of Black Gold in Tintin Hergé leaves to take a 12-week resting vacation in Switzerland, because he suffered from clinical depression. The story won't be continued until 27 October.
 August 13: First publication of Pepo's Condorito.
 August 17: The first episode of Al Posen's Rhymin' Time is published.
 Best Love debuts with issue #33, taking over the numbering of Sub-Mariner Comics - Timely Comics
Big Shot, with issue #104, is cancelled by Columbia Comics
Girls' Love Stories (1949 series) #1 - DC Comics
Lana (1948 series) #7 - Timely Comics
Marvel Tales debuts with issue #93, taking over the numbering of Marvel Mystery Comics - Timely Comics
 Two-Gun Kid (1948 series) #9 - Timely Comics
Venus (1948 series) #6 - Timely Comics

September
 September 11: The episode Ten Minutes, in the series The Spirit, is first published. This marks the first story written by Will Eisner's assistant Jules Feiffer, who will continue writing most of the series until 1952.

October
 October 16: The first gag of Poustiquet by Bindle is published. It will run over 25 years.
October 30: Debut of Ellsworth Bheezer, in a Sunday page comic by Manuel Gonzales and Bill Walsh.
 Captain America's Weird Tales (1941 series) #74 - Timely Comics
Cowboy Romances (1939 series) #1 - Timely Comics
 Alfred Harvey and Vic Herman's Little Dot makes her debut in Little Max Comics # 1.
 The final issue of Jerry Siegel and Joe Shuster's Slam Bradley is published.

November
Boy Commandos (1942 series), with issue #36 dated November–December, cancelled by DC Comics.
Little Lana (1948 series) #8 - Timely Comics - (Lana was renamed to Little Lana)
Marvel Tales (1939 series) #94 - Timely Comics
Two-Gun Kid (1948 series), with issue #10, cancelled by Timely Comics. (The title would be revived four years later by Marvel, continuing the numbering.)
Venus (1948 series) #8 - Timely Comics

December
 December 3: First publication of Pecos Bill by Guido Martina and Raffaele Paparella.
 December 15: The final issue of the Dutch comics magazine Doe Mee is published.
Cowboy Romances (1939 series) #2 - Timely Comics
True Western (1939 series) #1 - Timely Comics

Specific date unknown
 The first episode of Roland Davies' Sparks and Flash is published.
 Lancelot Hogben publishes the book From Cave Painting to Comic Strip. A Kaleidoscope of Human Communication.
 Reverend David S. Piper and Joseph Wirt Tillotson launch the first episode of Our Bible in Pictures.

Births

June
 June 11: Steve Moore, British comics writer (Axel Pressbutton, Future Shocks, Tom Strong's Terrific Tales), (d. 2014).

Deaths

February
 February 6: Eugène Vavasseur, French illustrator, poster artist and comic artist, passes away at age 85.
 February 15: Charles L. Bartholomew, aka Bart, American comics artist (Cousin Bill, George and his Conscience, Bud Smith, the Boy Who Does Stunts, Alexander the Cat, Mama's Girl-Daddy's Boy), dies at age 80.

March
 March 6: Storm P., Danish comics artist, animator, illustrator, painter and comedian (Peter og Ping), passes away at the age of 66.
 March 16: Stanley E. Armstrong, American comics artist (continued Slim Jim And The Force), passes away at age 85.
 March 21: Jo Valle, French comics writer (L'Espiègle Lili), dies at age 83.

April
 24 April: Reg Carter, British comics artist (Big Eggo) dies at the age of 62.

May
 May 12: Neysa McMein, American illustrator, painter and comics artist (Deathless Deer), dies at age 60.
 May 27: Robert L. Ripley, American comics artist, cartoonist, entrepreneur and anthropologist (Ripley's Believe It or Not!), dies at the age of 58 from a heart attack.

June
 10 June: John T. McCutcheon, American political cartoonist and occasional comics artist (Bird Center), dies at age 79.

July
 July 13: Walt Kuhn, American painter, illustrator and comics artist (Whisk), dies at age 71.

October
 October 8: Monte Barrett, American comics writer (Jane Arden), dies at age 52.

November
 November 13: Bern L. Vinger, Dutch illustrator and comics artist (Met Toto Op Reis), dies at age 77.
 November 30: Lester J. Ambrose, American comics artist (Simp Simpson), dies at age 70.

December
 December 3: Frank Miller, American comics artist (Barney Baxter), dies from a heart attack at the age of 51.
 December 7: Bovil, Swedish painter, illustrator, sculptor and comics artist (Tusen Och en Natt), dies at age 39. 
 December 8: Frank R. Leet, American comics artist (Al Acres), dies at age 68.
 December 11: Clifford K. Berryman, American cartoonist (Remember the Maine, Drawing the Line in Mississippi), dies at the age of 80.

Specific date unknown
 Jo Valle, French comics writer (L'Espiègle Lili), dies at age 84.
 André Vallet, French painter, illustrator and comics artist (L'Espiègle Lili), dies at age 79 or 80.
 Émile Vavasseur, French poster artist, comics artist and illustrator, dies at age 85 or 86.

First issues by title
 Buster Bunny, cover dated November, published by Standard Comics
 Girl Comics, cover-dated October, published by Timely Comics
 Girls' Love Stories, cover dated August–September, published by DC Comics
 Heart Throbs, cover-dated August, published by Quality Comics
 Kid Colt Outlaw, cover-dated May, published by Timely Comics
 Superboy, cover-dated March/April, published by DC Comics
 Torchy, cover-dated November, published by Quality Comics

Initial appearances by character name
Pow Wow Smith in Detective Comics #151 (September), created by Don Cameron and Carmine Infantino - DC Comics
Dr. Edward Clariss - Reverse Flash in Flash Comics'' #104 (February), created by John Broome and Joe Kubert - DC Comics

Sources